Exitos De Al Hurricane ("La Mula Bronca") is the eleventh album released by the New Mexican musician Al Hurricane in 1980?.

The lead single "La Mula Bronca" is one of Al Hurricane's more recognized rancheras.

Track listing

References

Al Hurricane albums
New Mexico music albums